SS Catala was a Canadian coastal passenger and cargo steamship built for service with the Union Steamship Company of British Columbia.

Nomenclature
Catala was named after Catala Island, which is at the entrance of Esperanza Inlet on the west coast of Vancouver Island. Catala Island had in turn been named in honour of Catholic missionary Fr. Magin Catalá, who was at Santa Cruz de Nuca on Vancouver Island in 1793.

Design and construction
Catala was built by the Coaster Construction Company of Montrose, Scotland, in 1925. The ship was similar to the Cardena, which was also owned by the Union Steamship Company. Catala was 229 feet long, with a beam of 37.1 feet and depth of hold of 18.4 feet. The ship was licensed to carry 267 passengers, with stateroom capacity for 120 persons and steerage bunks for 48. Catala had a cargo capacity of 300 tons, including a refrigerated chamber for 40 tons of boxed fish.

Catala was launched on February 25, 1925. The ship was delivered from Scotland to Vancouver under Capt. James Findlay, who had brought other steamships out from Scotland for the Union Steamship Company.

Union Steamship career
Under Capt. Andrew Johnstone, Catala began her first voyage for the company on July 28, 1925, steaming north from Vancouver to Prince Rupert and the Skeena and Nass rivers.

Grounding on Sparrowhawk Reef

On November 8, 1927, at 1:00 pm, on a south bound trip originating from Stewart, BC, Catala had left Port Simpson bound for Prince Rupert through the southern channel on the inside of Finlayson Island. This channel is called Cunningham Passage.

With Chief Officer Ernest Sheppard on the bridge, the ship struck a Sparrowhawk Reef. Sparrowhawk Reef was reported to have been marked with a warning buoy. Later during an inquiry into the incident, glaring sunlight conditions were found to have had some role in reducing the visibility. Capt. Alfred E. Dickson ordered the lifeboats lowered immediately, and with the aid of local people of the First Nations and their canoes, all passengers were taken off the ship and reached safety at Port Simpson, without loss.

The depth of water over the reef ranged from 23 feet at high tide to only 7 feet at low tide. Catala was held at a 45 degree angle between two pillars of rock. So much of the ship jutted out unsupported in the air that there was a fear the ship might break in two. The ship had been built with a double-bottom, which helped keep the water out of the hold. Efforts by tugs, specifically Salvage Princess, Cape Scott, and, from Vancouver, Salvage King, to bring off the ship failed, even though the ship had been lightened by off-loading cargo into smaller service ship. The company gave up the ship as lost, and abandoned her to the insurance underwriters, who then assumed responsibility for the salvage efforts. The company management did state that they would take the ship back if she could be brought off the reef.

Eventually, by incrementally blasting out the rock pillars, and patching the holes in the hull as blasting proceeded, the salvage crew was able to free the ship by December 5, 1927. The salvors took the ship to a temporary anchorage about a mile away, and thereafter to Prince Rupert. Eventually Catala was brought south to Vancouver, where at a cost of $175,000 the ship was repaired. The repair was supervised by W.D. McLaren, who had been in charge of Coaster Construction in Scotland when Catala had been built there, and had since relocated to Vancouver. On March 30, 1928, Catala resumed her weekly sailing schedule out of Vancouver, again under the command of Capt. Dickson.

Later career
In 1958 she was sold to new owners in British Columbia for use as a fish-buying ship. In Seattle's Century 21 Exposition she was a floating "boatel" moored on the Seattle waterfront. Later in 1962 she was towed to California and used as a floating restaurant. In 1963 she was brought back north to Ocean Shores, Washington and used as a "boatel" again until she was driven aground by a storm on New Year's Day 1965.

Scrapping

Following her grounding, efforts to re-float Catala failed, and the wreck was left to decay at the beach on Damon Point, Washington. Over the years she was vandalized and pillaged, and in the late 1980s a girl fell through a rusted portion of her deck, breaking her back. Her family sued the State of Washington, which in turn ordered the wreck cut up. Catala was cut down to sand level and buried, until a series of winter storms unburied her in the late 1990s. Subsequent storms gradually exposed more of the hull until in April 2006 a beachcomber noticed that oil was leaking from the wreck. The State of Washington Department of Ecology cordoned off the wreck and removed  of heavy fuel oil before scrapping the rest of the ship. Several endangered bird species nest in the area, including the snowy plover.

Notes

References
 Henry, Tom, The Good Company – An Affectionate History of the Union Steamships, Harbour Publishing, Madeira Park, BC (1994) 
 Newell, Gordon R., ed.H.W. McCurdy Marine History of the Pacific Northwest, Superior Publishing, Seattle WA (1966).
 Rushton, Gerald A., Whistle up the Inlet – The Union Steamship Story, J.J. Douglas, Vancouver, BC (1974).
 Rushton, Gerald A., Echoes of the Whistle - An Illustrated History of the Union Steamship Company, Douglas & McIntyre, Vancouver, BC (1980)

External links
 
 

 

1925 ships
Ships built in Scotland
Union Steamship Company of British Columbia
Shipwrecks of the Washington coast
Steamships of Canada
Steamships of the United States
History of Ocean Shores, Washington
Maritime incidents in 1927
Maritime incidents in 1965